The following television stations operate on virtual channel 4 in the United States:

 K02LH-D in Clarks Fork, Wyoming
 K03DJ-D in Polson, Montana
 K03IZ-D in Salinas, California
 K04DH-D in Gunnison, Colorado
 K04GF-D in Wolf Point, Montana
 K04JF-D in Nulato, Alaska
 K04JH-D in Homer, Alaska
 K04KP-D in Northway, Alaska
 K04KV-D in Unalaska, Alaska
 K04LB-D in Pelican, Alaska
 K04LZ-D in Galena, Alaska
 K04MM-D in Hyder, Alaska
 K04MN-D in Wales, Alaska
 K04MR-D in Gustavus, Alaska
 K04MT-D in Newtok, Alaska
 K04NK-D in Dolores, Colorado
 K04ON-D in Weber Canyon, Colorado
 K04OO-D in Ismay Canyon, Colorado
 K04QP-D in Casas Adobes, Arizona
 K04QV-D in Thompson Falls, Montana
 K04SA-D in Alexandria, Louisiana
 K04SD-D in Victoria, Texas
 K04SE-D in Parker, Arizona
 K04SF-D in Gustine, California
 K05BU-D in Enterprise, Utah
 K05MU-D in Leavenworth, Washington
 K06JA-D in Cedar Canyon, Utah
 K06NV-D in White Sulphur Spring, Montana
 K06QF-D in Heron, Montana
 K07CH-D in Plains & Paradise, Montana
 K07DU-D in Ely & McGill, Nevada
 K07DV-D in Ruth, Nevada
 K07IB-D in Whitewater, Montana
 K07NL-D in Juliaetta, Idaho
 K07OC-D in Polaris, Montana
 K08CB-D in Lund & Preston, Nevada
 K08CW-D in Malott/Wakefield, Washington
 K08CX-D in Tonasket, Washington
 K08FS-D in Dodson, Montana
 K08KA-D in Girdwood, Alaska
 K08KT-D in Boulder, Montana
 K08QB-D in Crouch/Garden Valley, Idaho
 K08QC-D in Sigurd & Salina, Utah
 K08QD-D in Woodland & Kamas, Utah
 K08QF-D in East Price, Utah
 K08QH-D in Roosevelt, etc., Utah
 K09BG-D in Basin, Montana
 K09FQ-D in Thompson Falls, Montana
 K09KJ-D in Tierra Amarilla, New Mexico
 K09LO-D in Cascade, Idaho
 K09QH-D in Kenai, Alaska
 K09SU-D in Hildale, etc., Utah
 K09WB-D in Powderhorn, Colorado
 K09YH-D in Scottsbluff, Nebraska
 K10DM-D in Riverside, Washington
 K10KR-D in Coolin, Idaho
 K10LG-D in Dryden, Washington
 K10LM-D in Laketown, etc., Utah
 K10LQ-D in Manhattan, Nevada
 K10MG-D in Socorro, New Mexico
 K10QH-D in Trout Creek, etc., Montana
 K10RA-D in Coulee City, Washington
 K11AT-D in Gunnison, Colorado
 K11CQ-D in Cedar City, Utah
 K11GH-D in Tri Cities, etc., Oregon
 K11HM-D in Bonners Ferry, Idaho
 K11IH-D in Malta, Montana
 K11KP-D in Troy, Montana
 K11OO-D in Pine Valley, etc., Utah
 K11PB-D in Cambridge, Idaho
 K11TJ-D in Sargents, Colorado
 K11WF-D in Mink Creek, Idaho
 K11WR-D in Council, Idaho
 K11WT-D in McCall, Idaho
 K12AK-D in Crested Butte, Colorado
 K12AL-D in Waunita Hot Springs, Colorado
 K12BA-D in Winthrop-Twisp, Washington
 K12CX-D in Tonasket, Washington
 K12QW-D in Silver City, New Mexico
 K12XD-D in Aurora, etc., Utah
 K13HM-D in Myrtle Creek, Oregon
 K13PZ-D in Poplar, Montana
 K13QK-D in Virgin, Utah
 K14MU-D in Weatherford, Oklahoma
 K14NF-D in Jacks Cabin, Colorado
 K14PF-D in Peoa/Oakley, Utah
 K14QV-D in Childress, Texas
 K14RY-D in Malad & surrounding area, Idaho
 K14SF-D in Brewster, etc., Washington
 K15HK-D in Sheridan, Wyoming
 K15HL-D in Cherokee & Alva, Oklahoma
 K15II-D in Newcastle, Wyoming
 K15KM-D in Sundance, Wyoming
 K15KT-D in Rural Sevier County, Utah
 K15KU-D in Teasdale/Torrey, Utah
 K15KY-D in Richfield, etc., Utah
 K15KZ-D in Koosharem, Utah
 K15LA-D in Panguitch, Utah
 K15LC-D in Henrieville, Utah
 K15LO-D in Fruitland, Utah
 K15MP-D in Rawlins, Wyoming
 K16DX-D in Gage, Oklahoma
 K16EK-D in Idalia, Colorado
 K16ET-D in Pleasant Valley, Colorado
 K16HD-D in Green River, Utah
 K16IO-D in Chugwater, Wyoming
 K16LG-D in Lund & Preston, Nevada
 K16LM-D in Teton Village, Wyoming
 K16LS-D in Grangeville, etc., Idaho
 K16LT-D in Dubois, etc., Wyoming
 K16LZ-D in Rural Garfield County, Utah
 K16MS-D in Cedar City, Utah
 K16MZ-D in Orangeville, Utah
 K16NU-D in Mountain View, etc., Wyoming
 K17FK-D in Montoya & Newkirk, New Mexico
 K17HQ-D in Hatch, Utah
 K17HY-D in Ridgecrest, etc., California
 K17ID-D in Cherokee & Alva, Oklahoma
 K17IP-D in Huntsville, etc., Utah
 K17JE-D in Mayfield, Utah
 K17KU-D in Saco, Montana
 K17KZ-D in Harlowton, etc., Montana
 K17ML-D in Red River, New Mexico
 K17NG-D in Sage Junction, Wyoming
 K17NI-D in Mesa, Colorado
 K17NV-D in Eureka, Nevada
 K18FU-D in Rural Beaver County, Utah
 K18IQ-D in Jacks Cabin, Colorado
 K18IR-D in Olivia, Minnesota
 K18JD-D in Torrington, Wyoming
 K18JJ-D in Crowheart, Wyoming
 K18LS-D in Strong City, Oklahoma
 K18LT-D in Eagle Nest, New Mexico
 K18LY-D in Seiling, Oklahoma
 K18MV-D in Scipio/Holden, Utah
 K18MZ-D in Forsyth, Montana
 K19DI-D in Crowley Lake Long, California
 K19DS-D in Pitkin, Colorado
 K19EY-D in Myton, Utah
 K19FF-D in Miles City, Montana
 K19FG-D in Jackson, Wyoming
 K19GN-D in Mount Pleasant, Utah
 K19GX-D in Buffalo, Wyoming
 K19HJ-D in Pinedale, etc., Wyoming
 K19JC-D in Mazama, Washington
 K19JM-D in Emigrant, Montana
 K19KW-D in Greybull, Wyoming
 K19LM-D in Cody/Powell, Wyoming
 K19MG-D in Rawlins, Wyoming
 K20FR-D in Hawthorne, Nevada
 K20HA-D in Caballo, New Mexico
 K20JD-D in Cherokee & Alva, Oklahoma
 K20JE-D in Navajo Mtn. Sch., etc., Utah
 K20JF-D in Oljeto, Utah
 K20KC-D in Mexican Hat, etc., Utah
 K20LK-D in Colstrip, etc., Montana
 K20NI-D in Akron, Colorado
 K20NM-D in Leamington, Utah
 K20NT-D in McDermitt, Nevada
 K21FO-D in Winnemucca, Nevada
 K21IB-D in Circleville, Utah
 K21JX-D in Huntington, Utah
 K21JZ-D in Nephi, Utah
 K21OH-D in Datil/Horse Springs, New Mexico
 K21OJ-D in Ruth, Nevada
 K21OT-D in Pasco-Kennewick, Washington
 K22ID-D in Alva Cherokee, Oklahoma
 K22JR-D in Turkey, Texas
 K22NB-D in Kanarraville etc., Utah
 K22NJ-D in Lucerne, Wyoming
 K22NM-D in Las Cruces, New Mexico
 K23DS-D in Evanston, Wyoming
 K23IX-D in Clark, etc., Wyoming
 K23IZ-D in Strong City, Oklahoma
 K23JC-D in Montezuma Creek/Aneth, Utah
 K23KC-D in Bluff, etc., Utah
 K23LF-D in Eureka, Nevada
 K23MT-D in Mexican Hat, Utah
 K23ND-D in Sayre, Oklahoma
 K23NF-D in Romeo, etc., Colorado
 K23NN-D in Las Vegas, New Mexico
 K23NQ-D in Lewiston, Idaho
 K23NY-D in St. George, Utah
 K23OI-D in Tucumcari, New Mexico
 K24GT-D in Kemmerer, Wyoming
 K24HJ-D in Manti, etc., Utah
 K24HP-D in Price, etc., Utah
 K24JG-D in Norfolk, Nebraska
 K24JL-D in Beowawe, Nevada
 K24KJ-D in Libby, Montana
 K24MK-D in Glenrock, Wyoming
 K24MQ-D in Marysvale, Utah
 K24MU-D in Summit County, Utah
 K24NE-D in Overton, Nevada
 K24NK-D in Memphis, Texas
 K25CP-D in Tulia, Texas
 K25FI-D in Mora, New Mexico
 K25JQ-D in May, etc., Oklahoma
 K25LI-D in Wright, Wyoming
 K25OR-D in McCall, Idaho
 K26CK-D in Cottonwood/Grangeville, Idaho
 K26DX-D in Raton, New Mexico
 K26HO-D in Glide, Oregon
 K26IS-D in Woodward, etc., Oklahoma
 K26LR-D in Helper, Utah
 K26MS-D in Collbran, Colorado
 K26NL-D in Gillette, Wyoming
 K26NM-D in Pullman, Washington
 K26OE-D in Elko, Nevada
 K26OW-D in Garden Valley, Idaho
 K26PD-D in Scobey, Montana
 K26PG-D in Woody Creek, Colorado
 K27IM-D in Billings, Montana
 K27KA-D in Parlin, Colorado
 K27LK-D in Gateview, Colorado
 K27NL-D in Clovis, New Mexico
 K27NN-D in Eureka, Nevada
 K27OD-D in Verdi/Mogul, Nevada
 K27OU-D in Lovell, Wyoming
 K28EA-D in Washington, Utah
 K28GI-D in Guymon, Oklahoma
 K28GX-D in Walker Lake, Nevada
 K28JU-D in Rock Springs, etc., Wyoming
 K28MK-D in Phillips County, Montana
 K28OQ-D in Fishlake Resort, Utah
 K28OU-D in Henefer, etc., Utah
 K28OY-D in Sierra Vista, Arizona
 K28PP-D in Shurz, Nevada
 K29EV-D in Valmy, Nevada
 K29HV-D in La Barge, etc., Wyoming
 K29IG-D in Sunlight Basin, Wyoming
 K29IH-D in Meeteetse, etc., Wyoming
 K29IS-D in Round Mountain, Nevada
 K29IU-D in Parlin, Colorado
 K29JO-D in Douglas, Wyoming
 K29KR-D in Camas Valley, Oregon
 K29LC-D in Truth or Consequence, New Mexico
 K29LX-D in Hanksville, Utah
 K29MZ-D in Clarendon, Texas
 K30DS-D in Lovelock, Nevada
 K30GJ-D in Colfax, New Mexico
 K30KM-D in Vernal, etc., Utah
 K30KX-D in Taos, New Mexico
 K30OE-D in Alton, Utah
 K30OR-D in Escalante, Utah
 K30OY-D in Logan, Utah
 K30PA-D in Roseau, Minnesota
 K30PH-D in Beaver, etc., Utah
 K30PT-D in Kalispell & Lakeside, Montana
 K31DC-D in Freedom, Wyoming
 K31FP-D in Heber/Midway, Utah
 K31FQ-D in Park City, Utah
 K31FR-D in Preston, Idaho
 K31IE-D in Susanville, etc., California
 K31IS-D in Toquerville, Utah
 K31IU-D in Morgan, etc., Utah
 K31JC-D in Duchesne, Utah
 K31JO-D in Wood River, etc., Wyoming
 K31JP-D in Manila, etc., Utah
 K31JQ-D in Woodward, etc., Oklahoma
 K31LF-D in Clareton, Wyoming
 K31LO-D in Eureka, Nevada
 K31MD-D in Kasilof, Alaska
 K31OM-D in Garrison, etc., Utah
 K32DC-D in Kanab, Utah
 K32GK-D in Elko, Nevada
 K32HP-D in Hanna, etc., Utah
 K32HQ-D in Boulder, Utah
 K32HR-D in Long Valley Junction, Utah
 K32HV-D in Vernal, etc., Utah
 K32IF-D in North Fork, etc., Wyoming
 K32JB-D in Fountain Green, Utah
 K32ML-D in Rural Garfield County, Utah
 K32MO-D in Capitol Reef National Park, Utah
 K32MP-D in Caineville, Utah
 K32MQ-D in Fremont, Utah
 K32MT-D in Tropic, etc., Utah
 K32MZ-D in Samak, Utah
 K32ND-D in Modena, etc., Utah
 K32NL-D in Deming, New Mexico
 K32NR-D in Winnemucca, Nevada
 K32OF-D in Elk City, Oklahoma
 K33AF-D in Ninilchik, Alaska
 K33DR-D in Montpelier, Idaho
 K33JI-D in Scofield, Utah
 K33JM-D in Mooreland, etc., Oklahoma
 K33JQ-D in Big Piney, etc., Wyoming
 K33LB-D in Redwood Falls, Minnesota
 K33LG-D in Bridger, etc., Montana
 K33NM-D in Omak, etc., Washington
 K33QL-D in Snowmass Village, Colorado
 K34AG-D in Parowan/Enoch, etc., Utah
 K34CM-D in Ely, Nevada
 K34CX-D in Apple Valley, Utah
 K34FR-D in Randolph & Woodruff, Utah
 K34OK-D in Coalville, Utah
 K34PD-D in Spring Glen, Utah
 K34PY-D in Mina/Luning, Nevada
 K34QL-D in Fallon, Nevada
 K34QX-D in Roundup, Montana
 K35FP in Tucumcari, New Mexico
 K35GO-D in Haxtun, Colorado
 K35IU-D in Frost, Minnesota
 K35IZ-D in Jackson, Minnesota
 K35KE-D in Hollis, Oklahoma
 K35MN-D in Omak, etc., Washington
 K35MQ-D in Weatherford, Oklahoma
 K35NU-D in Delta, Oak City, etc., Utah
 K35OA-D in Emery, Utah
 K35OB-D in Green River, Utah
 K35OC-D in Ferron, Utah
 K35OD-D in Clear Creek, Utah
 K35OL-D in Yuma, Colorado
 K36AC-D in Yuma, Colorado
 K36BW-D in Thompson Falls, Montana
 K36DI-D in Santa Rosa, New Mexico
 K36IG-D in Antimony, Utah
 K36JS-D in Grants, New Mexico
 K36LU-D in Ely, Nevada
 K36LX-D in Jacks Cabin, Colorado
 K36OU-D in Mountain View, Wyoming
 K36OV-D in Wanship, Utah
 K42KG-D in Fillmore, etc., Utah
 K44AG-D in Blanding/Monticello, Utah
 K45KV-D in Orderville, Utah
 K46AC-D in Willmar, Minnesota
 K46LY-D in Livingston, Montana
 KAID in Boise, Idaho
 KAKZ-LD in Cathedral City, California
 KAMR-TV in Amarillo, Texas
 KARK-TV in Little Rock, Arkansas
 KBTV-TV in Port Arthur, Texas
 KCNC-TV in Denver, Colorado
 KCWC-DT in Lander, Wyoming
 KCWO-TV in Big Spring, Texas
 KDBC-TV in El Paso, Texas
 KDFW in Dallas, Texas
 KDUH-TV in Scottsbluff, Nebraska
 KFOR-TV in Oklahoma City, Oklahoma
 KFQX in Grand Junction, Colorado
 KGBT-TV in Harlingen, Texas
 KHMT in Hardin, Montana
 KHVO in Hilo, Hawaii
 KITV in Honolulu, Hawaii
 KJNP-TV in North Pole, Alaska
 KLBY in Colby, Kansas
 KMAU in Wailuku, Hawaii
 KMNZ-LD in Coeur d'Alene, Idaho
 KMOV in St. Louis, Missouri
 KNBC in Los Angeles, California
 KOB in Albuquerque, New Mexico
 KOMO-TV in Seattle, Washington
 KPIC in Roseburg, Oregon
 KPRY-TV in Pierre, South Dakota
 KRDK-TV in Valley City, North Dakota
 KRNV-DT in Reno, Nevada
 KRON-TV in San Francisco, California
 KSNB-TV in York, Nebraska
 KTBY in Anchorage, Alaska
 KTIV in Sioux City, Iowa
 KTVX in Salt Lake City, Utah
 KUBD in Ketchikan, Alaska
 KUMN-LD in Moses Lake, etc., Washington
 KUWB-LD in Bloomington, Utah
 KVHF-LD in Fresno, California
 KVOA in Tucson, Arizona
 KWSE in Williston, North Dakota
 KXLF-TV in Butte, Montana
 KXLY-TV in Spokane, Washington
 KXMN-LD in Spokane, etc., Washington
 W03AK-D in Ela, etc., North Carolina
 W04DN-D in Auburn, Alabama
 W04DW-D in Sylva, etc., North Carolina
 W04DY-D in Maple Valley, Michigan
 W04DZ-D in Sutton, West Virginia
 W05AR-D in Bryson City, etc., North Carolina
 W06AJ-D in Franklin, etc., North Carolina
 W07DS-D in Burnsville, North Carolina
 W07DT-D in Tryon & Columbus, North Carolina
 W10AK-D in Spruce Pine, North Carolina
 W10AL-D in Cherokee, etc., North Carolina
 W10DF-D in Canton, etc., North Carolina
 WACP in Atlantic City, New Jersey
 WAPA-TV in San Juan, Puerto Rico
 WBZ-TV in Boston, Massachusetts
 WCBI-TV in Columbus, Mississippi
 WCCO-TV in Minneapolis, Minnesota
 WCMH-TV in Columbus, Ohio
 WDAF-TV in Kansas City, Missouri
 WDIV-TV in Detroit, Michigan
 WFOR-TV in Miami, Florida
 WGWG in Charleston, South Carolina
 WHBF-TV in Rock Island, Illinois
 WIVB-TV in Buffalo, New York
 WJXT in Jacksonville, Florida
 WLCU-CD in Campbellsville, Kentucky
 WMOW in Crandon, Wisconsin
 WNBC in New York, New York
 WNHT-LD in Alabaster, Alabama
 WNJX-TV in Mayaguez, Puerto Rico
 WOAI-TV in San Antonio, Texas
 WOAY-TV in Oak Hill, West Virginia
 WODN-LD in Portage, Indiana
 WRC-TV in Washington, D.C.
 WSKY-TV in Manteo, North Carolina
 WSMV-TV in Nashville, Tennessee
 WTAE-TV in Pittsburgh, Pennsylvania
 WTIN-TV in Ponce, Puerto Rico
 WTMJ-TV in Milwaukee, Wisconsin
 WTOM-TV in Cheboygan, Michigan
 WTTV in Bloomington, Indiana
 WTVY in Dothan, Alabama
 WUNC-TV in Chapel Hill, North Carolina
 WUVM-LD in Atlanta, Georgia
 WWAY-LD in Wilmington, North Carolina
 WWL-TV in New Orleans, Louisiana
 WYFF in Greenville, South Carolina

The following stations, which are no longer licensed, formerly operated on virtual channel 4:
 K04OF-D in Sargents, Colorado
 K06QO-D in Martinsdale, Montana
 K10AF-D in Troy, Montana
 K16CP-D in Granite Falls, Minnesota
 K24DA-D in Big Piney, etc., Wyoming
 K26PH-D in Clarks Fork, Wyoming
 K29BH-D in Wellington, Texas
 K29BR-D in Canadian, Texas
 K31GC-D in Forrest, New Mexico
 K33JB-D in Orderville, Utah
 K38BU-D in Gruver, Texas
 K39KE-D in Chalfant Valley, California
 K39LV-D in Perryton, Texas
 K41BW-D in New Mobeetie, Texas
 K42CH-D in Capulin, etc., New Mexico
 K42GN-D in Preston, Idaho
 K43LV-D in Chalfant Valley, California
 K49BB-D in Follett, Texas
 K51AQ-D in Ukiah, California

References

04 virtual